Weston is an unincorporated community in Crittenden County, Kentucky, United States.

Weston was incorporated in 1868, and became a shipping point on the Ohio River. Its post office closed in 1916.

References

Unincorporated communities in Kentucky
Unincorporated communities in Crittenden County, Kentucky